The Oceanic island nation of the Federated States of Micronesia competed at the 2012 Summer Olympics in London, held from 27 July to 12 August 2012. This was the nation's fourth consecutive appearance at the Olympics.

Federated States of Micronesia National Olympic Committee (FSMNOC) exceeded by one its athletes sent to any of the previous three Olympic Games. Six athletes were selected to the team, competing in 4 different sports; two of them had competed in Beijing, including swimmer Kerson Hadley, who set his personal best in the men's freestyle event. Weightlifter Manuel Minginfel, who competed in the Olympics since the national debut, repeated his best performance from Athens, after finishing in tenth place. FSMNOC appointed him to reprise his role for the fourth time as the national flag bearer at the opening ceremony. The island nation has yet to win its first Olympic medal.

Athletics

Men

Women

Swimming

Men

Women

Weightlifting

Micronesia has won 1 quota in weightlifting.

Wrestling

Micronesia has qualified in the following events.

Men's Greco-Roman

References

Nations at the 2012 Summer Olympics
2012
Oly